WEC 52: Faber vs. Mizugaki was a mixed martial arts event held by World Extreme Cagefighting on November 11, 2010 at The Pearl at The Palms in Las Vegas.

Background
Urijah Faber made his bantamweight debut against Japanese striker Takeya Mizugaki at WEC 52.

A bout between Bart Palaszewski and Kamal Shalorus was expected to take place at this event, but was moved to WEC 53 after Shalorus injured his hand. 

Brian Bowles was expected to face Wagnney Fabiano at this event but was forced off the card with an injury and replaced by Joseph Benavidez.

Eddie Wineland was expected to face Damacio Page at this event, but was forced out of the bout with a shoulder injury and replaced by Demetrious Johnson.

Josh Grispi was pulled from his fight with Erik Koch, to be inserted into a UFC Featherweight title shot against José Aldo at UFC 125.  Koch ended up fighting Francisco Rivera.

This was the last WEC event to feature fights in the featherweight division. No featherweight fighters competed on the final WEC card the next month, and all fighters in the division were subsequently merged into the UFC.

With longtime Zuffa ring announcer Bruce Buffer in Germany for UFC 122, former WEC ring announcer Joe Martinez made a return to handle announcing duties for this event.

The event drew an average of 570,000 viewers on Versus.

Results

Bonus Awards
Fighters were awarded $10,000 bonuses.
Fight of the Night:  Cub Swanson vs.  Mackens Semerzier
Knockout of the Night:  Erik Koch
Submission of the Night:  Urijah Faber

Reported payout 
The following is the reported payout to the fighters as reported to the Nevada State Athletic Commission. It does not include sponsor money or "locker room" bonuses often given by the WEC and also do not include the WEC's traditional "fight night" bonuses.

Urijah Faber: $56,000 (includes $28,000 win bonus) def. Takeya Mizugaki: $10,000
Chad Mendes: $17,000 ($8,500 win bonus) def. Javier Vazquez: $11,000
Erik Koch: $8,000 ($4,000 win bonus) def. Francisco Rivera: $4,000
Joseph Benavidez: $35,000 ($17,500 win bonus) def. Wagnney Fabiano: $19,000
Demetrious Johnson: $8,000 ($4,000 win bonus) def. Damacio Page: $9,000
Raphael Assunção: $26,000 ($13,000 win bonus) def. LC Davis: $11,000
Anthony Njokuani: $14,000 ($7,000 win bonus) def. Eddie Faaloloto: $3,500
Dustin Poirier: $6,000 ($3,000 win bonus) def. Zach Micklewright: $3,000
Michael McDonald: $6,000 ($3,000 win bonus) def. Clint Godfrey: $3,000
Cub Swanson: $22,000 ($11,000 win bonus) def. Mackens Semerzier: $4,000
Yves Jabouin: $5,000 ($2,000 win bonus) def. Brandon Visher: $4,000

See also
 World Extreme Cagefighting
 List of World Extreme Cagefighting champions
 List of WEC events
 2010 in WEC

External links
Official WEC website

References

World Extreme Cagefighting events
2010 in mixed martial arts
Mixed martial arts in Las Vegas
2010 in sports in Nevada
Palms Casino Resort